Cristhian A. Martínez Mercedes (born March 6, 1982) is a Dominican former professional Major League Baseball pitcher. He pitched for the Florida Marlins and the Atlanta Braves in his five season career.

Career

Detroit Tigers
Martínez signed as an international free agent with the Detroit Tigers in 2003.  He remained with the Tigers organization through the 2006 season, pitching for the Gulf Coast Tigers, Oneonta Tigers, West Michigan White Caps and Lakeland Tigers, never rising above Class-A.

Florida Marlins

He was drafted by the Florida Marlins in the minor league draft on December 7, 2006.

Martínez made his Major League debut with the Marlins on May 21, 2009. On June 1, 2009 he collected his first win in the Majors after tossing 1.2 innings of scoreless relief against the Brewers. He was sent down to AAA New Orleans Zephyrs immediately after the game. Overall, he pitched in 15 games that season, owning a 1–1 win–loss record with a 5.13 earned run average.

Atlanta Braves
He was claimed off waivers by the Atlanta Braves on April 8, 2010. He was optioned to AAA Gwinnett Braves, where he pitched in 23 games, and was later called up to Atlanta in the beginning of September.

After qualifying as a Super Two earlier in the offseason, on January 18, 2013, Martinez agreed to a one-year, $750,000 deal to avoid arbitration with the Braves. On April 12, 2013, Martinez, who suffered from a shoulder strain was placed on the disabled list in order to make room for recently acquired reliever Luis Ayala. He pitched in two games that year, giving up two runs to the Philadelphia Phillies in his first appearance and pitched two scoreless innings against the Chicago Cubs on April 6. On July 9, Martinez underwent shoulder surgery and was ruled out for the rest of the 2013 season and missed the entirety of the 2014 season. On December 2, 2013, Martinez, along with shortstop Paul Janish and infielder Elliot Johnson was non-tendered by the Braves, making them a free agent.

References

External links

1982 births
Living people
Atlanta Braves players
Dominican Republic expatriate baseball players in the United States
Florida Marlins players
Greensboro Grasshoppers players
Gulf Coast Braves players
Gulf Coast Tigers players
Gwinnett Braves players
Jacksonville Suns players
Jupiter Hammerheads players
Lakeland Tigers players

Major League Baseball pitchers
Major League Baseball players from the Dominican Republic
Mississippi Braves players
Oneonta Tigers players
West Michigan Whitecaps players